Willie Frank Middlebrooks (born February 12, 1979 in Miami, Florida) is a former cornerback of the National Football League and Canadian Football League.

Middlebrooks was named First-Team All-State as a senior at Homestead High School in Homestead, Florida. He played college football for the Minnesota Golden Gophers. In 1999, he was named Second-Team All-Big Ten. In 2000, he was named First-Team All-Big Ten Conference, but missed the final four games of the season with a fractured ankle. Prior to the 2001 NFL Draft, he was regarded as the best man-coverage player in the Big Ten, with speculation that he would be drafted in the first round, despite his recent injury.

He was the 24th overall pick of the Denver Broncos in the 2001 NFL Draft. He began his career with the Broncos, then played for the San Francisco 49ers before returning to Denver in 2006. 

Middlebrooks signed as a free agent with the Argonauts on April 28, 2008. He was named defensive player of Week One of the 2008 CFL season with nine tackles and an interception of a long pass from Winnipeg's Kevin Glenn near the end of the fourth quarter.

On June 1, 2011, Middlebrooks announced his retirement after sustaining a serious neck injury he received nearing the end of the 2010 CFL season.

References

1979 births
Living people
Players of American football from Miami
American football cornerbacks
Minnesota Golden Gophers football players
Denver Broncos players
San Francisco 49ers players
Toronto Argonauts players
Homestead High School (Homestead, Florida) alumni
Players of Canadian football from Miami